SS Bernard Carter was a Liberty ship built in the United States during World War II. She was named after Bernard Carter, a lawyer, professor, and politician from Maryland. Carter was corporate attorney in Baltimore and a professor at the University of Maryland.

Construction
Bernard Carter was laid down on 6 June 1942, under a Maritime Commission (MARCOM) contract, MCE hull 55, by the Bethlehem-Fairfield Shipyard, Baltimore, Maryland; she was sponsored by Mrs. C.E. Walsh Jr., the wife of the chief of the procurement division of MARCOM in Washington DC, and was launched on 29 July 1942.

History
She was allocated to American South African Line, on 8 August 1942. On 1 June 1946, she was laid up in the James River Reserve Fleet, Lee Hall, Virginia, with approximately $100,000 in damage to her bottom. She was sold for scrapping on 18 September 1958, to Bethlehem Steel Co., for $76,191. She was withdrawn from the fleet on 27 January 1960.

References

Bibliography

 
 
 
 

 

Liberty ships
Ships built in Baltimore
1942 ships
James River Reserve Fleet